Widgee Crossing South is a rural locality in the Gympie Region, Queensland, Australia.

Geography
The Mary River forms the north-eastern boundary. Eel Creek forms the south-eastern boundary and part of the eastern as it flows north to join the Mary, while Snake Creek forms part of the southern boundary before it joins the Eel.

References 

Gympie Region
Localities in Queensland